Glassford is a village in Scotland.

Glassford may also refer to:

People
 Bill Glassford (1914–2016), American football player and coach
 John Glassford (1715–1783), Scottish Tobacco Lord
 John Glassford (Canadian football) (b. 1953), Canadian linebacker
 John Glassford (cricketer) (b. 1946), English cricketer
 Samuel M. Glassford (1825–1901), American politician
 William A. Glassford (1886–1958), American admiral
 Henry Glassford Bell (1803–1874), Scottish lawyer, poet, and historian

Places
 Glassford Island, a  small island in Lough Owel, County Westmeath, Ireland